BKS was a Canadian techno group created by radio DJ Chris Sheppard, with Hennie Bekker and Greg Kavanagh (BKS = Bekker, Kavanagh, Sheppard). They were best known  for collaborating with hockey personality Don Cherry to create the song "Rock Em Sock Em Techno".

History
BKS worked with Don Cherry on the song "Rock Em Sock Em Techno". The resulting video was named by MuchMusic as the worst video of 1993, although the video sold in excess of 550,000 copies.

BKS recorded three albums of contemporary techno. The band's other hits included "Take Control" and "The Square Dance Song" (a collaboration with Ashley MacIsaac). Their singles "I'm in Love with You" and "Living in Ecstasy", were both club  and radio mix show hits. Their single "Astroplane" won a Juno Award in 1996.  BKS songs were included on DJ and MuchMusic promoted CD compilations, including Pirate Radio Volume 5.

BKS disbanded in 1997.

Discography

Studio albums

Singles

References

Canadian techno music groups
Canadian Eurodance groups
Canadian musical trios
Juno Award for Dance Recording of the Year winners
Quality Records artists